Misoča is one of the biggest parts of Ilijaš Municipality, known in Bosnian as Naselje Misoča. It is the biggest community in the municipality of Ilijaš with 981 residents. Ethnically, there is majority of Bosniaks of 857 people, 121 are Serbs, 6 are Croats, 9 are others with none classified as others. Otherwise, the community of Misoča is known as the place with the first organized Bosniak defence against local Serbs.

Misoča is the largest area in municipality Ilijaš, Sarajevo Canton.

History
Prior to the war in Bosnia and Herzegovina, this place was separated into two parts: Donja Misoča and Gornja Misoča. Now, it is one place, with one local community – Misoča. Places in Misoča are: Bare, Dedići, Glavica, Matorugin Han, Katane, Misoča, Mlini, Pušine and Strana. Misoča is 18 kilometers far from Sarajevo and only one mile from municipality Ilijaš.

References

Populated places in Ilijaš